The  (lit. New Airport Expressway) is a 4-laned national expressway in Narita, Chiba, Japan. It is owned and operated by East Nippon Expressway Company.

Overview

The expressway is a short connector route linking Narita International Airport (formerly New Tokyo International Airport) with the Higashi-Kantō Expressway, which eventually leads into the Tokyo urban area.

The route of the expressway runs alongside National Route 295.

Interchange list
 IC - interchange, JCT - junction

References

External links 

 East Nippon Expressway Company

Expressways in Japan
Roads in Chiba Prefecture